Berechurch is an area of Colchester and former civil parish, now in the unparished area of Colchester, in the Colchester district, in the county of Essex, England. In 1891 the parish had a population of 167. On 26 March 1897 the parish was abolished to form Colchester.

St Michael's Church is a redundant church dating from the 14th century which was restored in 1872. It is a grade II* listed building.

References

Populated places in Essex
Former civil parishes in Essex
Colchester (town)